Doorley Creek is a stream in Greater Madawaska, Renfrew County in Eastern Ontario, Canada. It is in the Saint Lawrence River drainage basin and is a right tributary of Black Donald Creek.

Course
Doorley Creek begins at the confluence of two unnamed creeks just north of Ontario Highway 41. It flows southeast under the highway, then under the local Doorley Creek Road; from this point to its mouth, it is paralleled by the road. The creek turns south, then again southeast, and reaches its mouth at Black Donald Creek. Black Donald Creek flows via Black Donald Lake, the Madawaska River, and the Ottawa River to the Saint Lawrence River.

References

Rivers of Renfrew County